Dressmann is a chain of men's clothing stores owned by Varner-Gruppen. It was founded in Norway by Frank Varner, who opened the first store in Oslo in 1967. In addition to Norway, Dressmann stores can now be found in Sweden, Finland, Germany, Latvia (to 2014), Iceland and Denmark. In 2013 the number of stores had grown to 400. In 2010 it started a one-year collaboration with the rock band The Rolling Stones. Dressmann got the rights to use old classical songs in advertisement as well as artwork created by the Rolling Stones.

Dressmann is now the leading chain of men's clothing stores in Northern Europe.

Insolvency in Austria 
Due to the strict COVID regulations in 2020 imposed by the Austrian leading government party ÖVP under then chancellor Sebastian Kurz (see Kurz corruption probe), Dressmann stores in Austria had to stay closed for weeks. As a result, Dressmann Austria filed for insolvency on May the 18th. Around 50 creditors with total claims of 14.2 million euros are affected by the insolvency proceedings. The last Dressmann store in Austria closed on 31st of August, followed by sale that saw products' prices reduced to up to 50%.

References

External links 
 Official page

Clothing companies of Norway
Retail companies of Norway